= Henchir-Bir Aïssa =

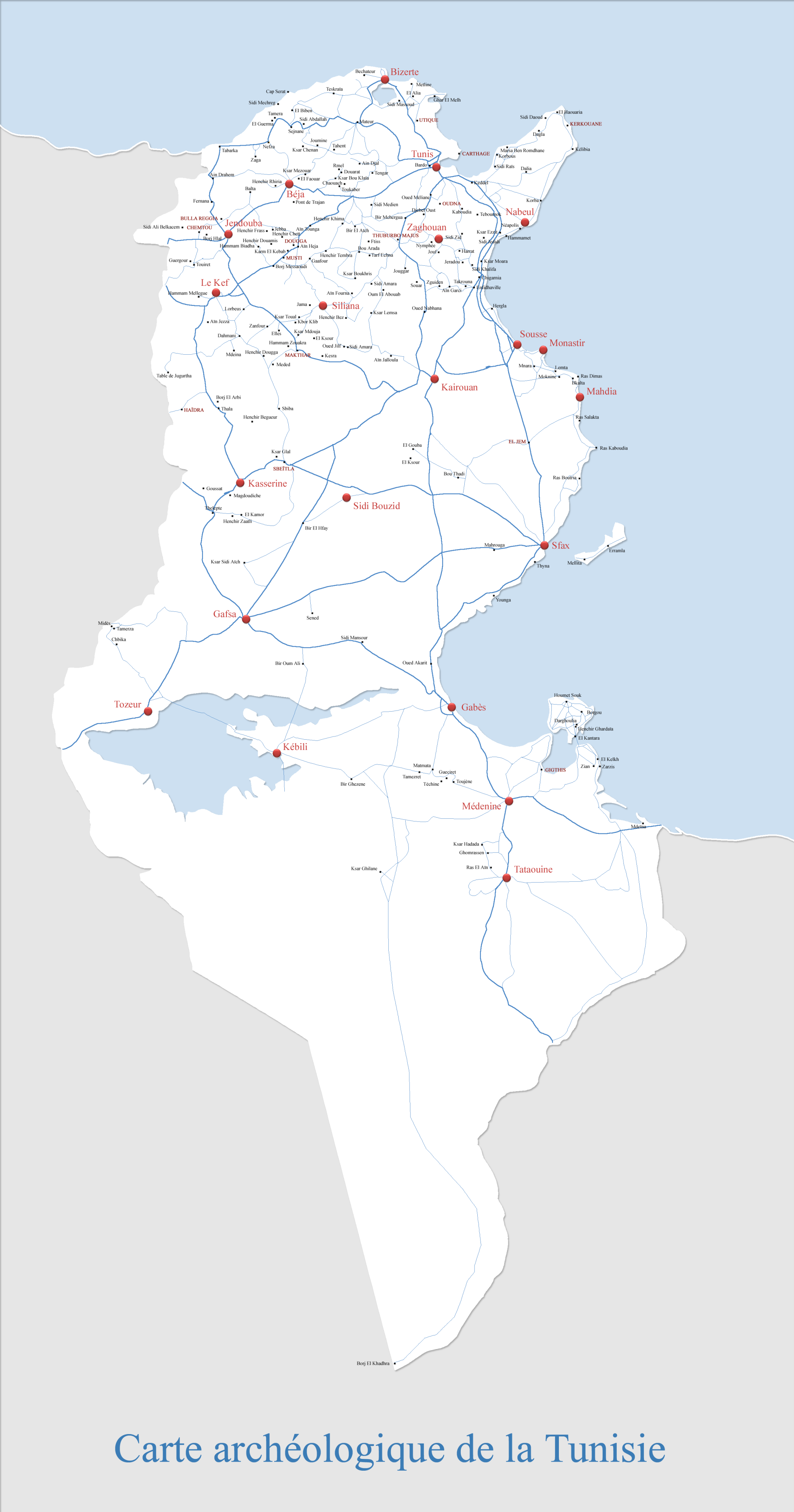
Archaeology map of Tunisia

Henchir-Bir Aïssa is a former Roman and Byzantine town of Africa In modern Tunisia near the modern town of near Douar Ali Ben Ahmar. The town is located on a Wadi although it was known in antiquity as a well town. The site is 37.6 km south from Tunisia.

The remains of the town, On a plateau between the above two rivers include a Roman Fort, ancient well and a Roman Road.
